Patrick Alen Teixeira (born 5 December 1990) is a Brazilian professional boxer who held the WBO light middleweight title from 2019 to February 2021.

Professional career
Teixeira turned professional in 2009, winning his first 25 fights before facing Curtis Stevens on 7 May 2016 (on the undercard of Canelo Álvarez vs. Amir Khan), who stopped him in two rounds to win the vacant World Boxing Council Continental Americas middleweight title. Previously, on 15 March 2014, Teixeira defeated Ignacio Lucero Fraga by a first-round KO to become the Latino super welterweight champion. He signed with Golden Boy Promotions in 2015 and was predicted to become Brazil's best chance of winning a boxing world title.

On 1 September, 2018, Teixeira fought Nathaniel Gallimore. Teixeira won via unanimous decision, winning 78-74 on all three scorecards.

On 30 November, 2019, Teixeira fought his biggest fight up to date, fighting against Carlos Adames for the WBO interim light middleweight title. Teixeira was ranked #2 by the WBO, and #12 by the WBC and WBA at super welterweight at the time, while his opponent was ranked #1 by the WBO, #3 by the IBF, #4 by the WBA and #5 by the WBC in the same division. Teixeira, despite being the underdog, managed to secure a unanimous decision win, scoring 114-113 on two of the scorecards and 116-111 on the third one. Teixeira managed to drop Adames in the seventh round, which proved to be the decisive factor on the scorecards.

Professional boxing record

References
7http://www.engeplus.com.br/noticia/esporte-amador/2013/apos-vencer-luta-nos-eua-pugilista-patrick-teixeira-retorna-a-terra-natal/

External links 

Golden Boy Promotions profile
Patrick Teixeira - Profile, News Archive & Current Rankings at Box.Live

|-

|-

Living people
1990 births
People from Santa Catarina (state)
Sportspeople from Santa Catarina (state)
Brazilian male boxers
Light-middleweight boxers
Middleweight boxers
World light-middleweight boxing champions
World Boxing Organization champions